Barry Coughlan (born 4 July 1990) is an Irish hurler who currently plays as a full-back for the Waterford senior team.

Honours

University College Cork
Fitzgibbon Cup (2): 2012, 2013

Ballygunner
Munster Senior Club Hurling Championship (1): 2018
Waterford Senior Hurling Championship (4): 2011, 2014, 2015, 2016, 2017, 2018, 2019

Waterford
National Hurling League (1): 2015

Munster
Railway Cup (1): 2016

References

1990 births
Living people
Ballygunner hurlers
Waterford inter-county hurlers
Munster inter-provincial hurlers